Pocharam may refer to:

 Pocharam, Ranga Reddy district, a village in Telangana, India
 Pocharam lake, a lake in Telangana, India
 Pocharam Wildlife Sanctuary, a forest in Telangana, India
 Pocharam Srinivas Reddy (born 1976), Indian politician